Bernhard Lang (born 24 February 1957 Linz, Austria) is an Austrian composer, improviser and programmer of musical patches and applications. His work can be described as contemporary classical, with roots, however, in various genres such as 20th-century avant-garde, European classical music, jazz, free jazz, rock, punk, techno, EDM, electronica, electronic music, and computer-generated music. His works range from solo pieces and chamber music to large ensemble pieces and works for orchestra and musical theatre. Besides music for concert halls, Lang designs sound and music for theatre, dance, film and sound installations.

Bernhard Lang came to prominence with his work cycle Differenz/Wiederholung (Difference/Repetition), composed between 1998 and 2013, in which he illuminated and examined the themes of reproductive and DJ cultures based on the philosophic work of Gilles Deleuze. Sociocultural and societally critical questions, as in Das Theater der Wiederholungen/The Theatre of Repetitions (2003) are as closely examined as intrinsic musical and music-cultural problems ("I hate Mozart", 2006). Another focus is the "recycling" of historic music, which Lang performs using self-programmed patches, applying filter and mutation processes (as in the "Monadologie" cycle).

Alongside classical European instruments, Lang also makes use of their amplified electrical counterparts (e.g. electric viola) as well as mutually microtonally de-tuned ensemble groups. Analogue and digital synthesizers, keyboards, rock music instruments (electric guitar and bass, drumset), turntables (the trailblazing instrument of the reproductive culture), rappers, Arabian singers, speech and live-electronics (mainly the self-programmed "Loop Generator") are similarly used.

Biography

Bernhard Lang studied at the Brucknerkonservatorium in Linz (Austria). In 1975, he moved to Graz to study philosophy and German philology, jazz (Dieter Glawischnig), piano (Harald Neuwirth), counterpoint (Hermann Markus Pressl), and harmony and composition (Andrzej Dobrowolski). From 1977 to 1981, he worked with various jazz ensembles as composer, arranger and piano player. At the Institute of Electronic Music (IEM) in Graz, he started to confront electronic music and computer-based composition systems. From 1984 to 1989, he worked at the Conservatory in Graz while continuing his studies with Georg Friedrich Haas and Gösta Neuwirth. In 1987, he co-founded the composer's club "die andere saite" (loosely "the alternate string", a German-language pun referring also to "the other side"). Together with W. Ritsch, he developed the software CADMUS in C++. In 1989, he began teaching at the Graz University of the Arts.

In 1999, he moved to Vienna as a freelance composer.

 since 2003: Associate professor for composition at the University of Arts, Graz
 since 2003: Activities in theatre and dance, cooperation with Xavier Le Roy, Willi Dorner, Christine Gaigg
 2004/05: Scholarship of the International Artist House Villa Concordia in Bamberg
 2007: Working residence in "Künstleratelier", Thomas Bernhard Archiv, Gmunden
 2007/08: "Composer in residence", Theatre Basel
 2008/09: Capell-Compositeur of the Sächsische Staatskapelle Dresden
 2013: Guest lecturer for composition in Luzern
 2014: Mentoring project in Potsdam

Lang frequently collaborates with artists form other genres including choreographers, electronic musicians, video artists and DJs. He is particularly known for the provocatively titled opera I Hate Mozart, with libretto by Michael Sturminger, composed for the Viennese Mozart year festival in 2006. Das Theater der Wiederholungen, based on the writings of the Marquis de Sade and William S. Burroughs and choreographed by Xavier Le Roy, was premiered at the Graz in 2003. His Monadology II was given its British premiere at the Edinburgh International Festival in September 2008, broadcast on BBC Radio 3. Monadology uses a concept Lang calls "musical-cellular processing", which Lang says is derived from Leibniz's Monadology.

Festivals
 Steirischer Herbst (Styrian Autumn), Graz 1984, 1988, 1991, 1995, 1999, 2003, 2008, 2010
 Moscow Alternativa Festival
 Moscow Modern
 "resistance fluctuations" Los Angeles 1998
 Tage Absoluter Musik Allentsteig I und II (Days of absolute music)
 Klangarten
 Lisbon Festival 1998
 Wien Modern, 2006 as central composer
 Münchner Opernfestspiele (Opera Festival Munich)
 Darmstädter Ferienkurse
 Donaueschingen Festival
 Salzburg Festival
 Disturbances, Music theatre workshop Kopenhagen 2003
 Wittener Tage für neue Kammermusik (Days of New Chamber Music Witten)
 Impuls Tanz Wien (Impuls Dance Vienna)

Awards and honors
 Music Prize, City of Graz 1986
 1st Prize Alpe-Adria Composition Competition 1988
 Sponsorship "Musikprotokoll" Graz 1988
 Special Honour of the Federal Council of Science, Austria
 Andrej Dobrowolski Price Styria 2001
 Anton Bruckner Sponsorship Upper Austria 2001
 Sponsorship International Artist House Villa Concordia in Bamberg 2004/05
 Central Composer at Wien Modern (Vienna Modern)
 Capell-Compositeur of the "Sächsische Staatskapelle" Dresden 2008/09
 Music Prize City of Vienna 2008
 "Erste Bank" Composition Award 2009

Works
 Playing Trump, libretto by Dieter Sperl, premiered at the Staatsoper Hamburg (Hamburg State Opera) (2021)
Der Hetzer (2019) Commissioned by Theater Dortmund. Premiered Oct. 26, 2021.
The Living Dead Commedia dell'arte-Oper, libretto by David Zurbuchen, commissioned by Ensemble PHACE 2014 (2015)
 Hemma Musical theater, libretto by Joachim Vötter, commissioned by Stadttheater Klagenfurt 2015 (2014)
 Der Golem, based on texts by Gustav Meyrinck. musical theater for large orchestra, quire and voices [100']. commissioned by Nationaltheater Mannheim for 2016 (2014)
 DW26 "The Exhausted" for voice and ensemble, based on texts by Beckett und Deleuze [40'], commissioned by Ensemble SoundInitiative Paris and 2015 Bendigo International Festival of Exploratory Music (2014)
 DW23b "Loops for Dr. X" for clarinet, electric flute, cello and pickup, electric guitar, keyboard and laptop, double bass [25'] (2014)
 DW25 "..more Loops for U." for double bass solo [15'] (2014)
 Monadologie XXIX "London in the Rain" for flute, recorder, harp and cembalo [17'] (2014)
 Monadologie XXVIII "Seven" for flute, violin, cello, keyboard and piano, adaption of Beethoven VIIth Sinfony [24'] (2013)
 Songbook 3 for soprano voice and piano, based on texts of "West-Östlicher Divan" [20'] (2013)
 DW24 "Loops for Al Jourgensen" [24'] (2013)
 DW23 "Loops for Doctor X" for clarinet, violin and pickup, cello and pickup, electric guitar, keyboard and laptop (2013)
 Songbook 2 for bariton voice and piano, based on texts by Dieter Sperl and Christian Loidl [18'] (2013)
 Monadologie XXVII "Brahms-Variationen" for clarinet, violoncello and piano (2013)
 Monadologie XXVI "...for Pauline and Conrad" for two violins detuned in quarter tones, based on materials by Paganini and Bach [18'] (2013)
 Monadologie XXV "10 Paintings" based on artworks by Lisa-Abbott-Canfield for large orchestra [10'] (2013)
 Monadologie XXIV "The Stoned Guest", chort opera for 3 voices, flute, clarinet, cello, akkordeon and percussion [15'], commissioned by IGNM (2013)
 Monadologie XXIII "...For Stanley K." for large orchestra [6'], commissioned by RSO commissioned by Wien Modern (2013)
 Epilog 2 for soprano voice, clarinet, violin, viola, double bass, akkordeon and laptop [8'], nach Texten von P. Levi (2013)
 Der Reigen musical theater for 23 instruments, commissioned by Schwetzinger Festspiele (2012)
 Monadologie XXII "SolEtude for Re" by PurcelLang für countertenor solo
 Monadologie XXI "...for Franz II" for flute, cioloncello and quarter tone akkordeon (based on Schubert op.99) [15'] (2012)
 Monadologie XX "...for Franz I" for piano trio (based on Schubert op.100) [20'] (2012)
 Monadologie XIII "The Saucy Maid" for 2 orchestral groups mutually a quarter tone detuned (based on Anton Bruckner's "Linzer Sinfonie - Das Kecke Beserl" ) [60'] commissioned by Donaueschinger Musiktage 2013 (2011/12)
 Monadologie XIX "SacRemix....for Igor" for large orchestra [30'] (2012)
 Monadologie XVIII "Moving Architecture" for voice, fl, cl, hrn, tp, synth, perc, 1-1-1-1 and choreography by plans of ACF (by R. Abraham) and texts by B. Dylan and Rose Ausländer (U.A. NYC 2012) [55'] (2011/12)
 Monadologie XVII "SheWAsOne" for fl, cl, ob, bsn, hrn, tp, synth, perc, 4-1-1-1 (10') (2011)
 Hermetica V "Fremde Sprachen" for bass clarinet and 7 voices [30'] (U.A. 2013, Stuttgarter Vocalsolisten) (2011)
 Hermetica IV "O Dolorosa Gioia" for double quire and two organs mutually quarter tone detuned [30'] U.A. Heidelberg 2012 (2011)
 Schrift 5 für Stimme Solo [10'], based on texts by Christian Loidl (2011)
 Monadologie XVI "Solfeggio" for flute solo [5'] (2011)
 Monadologie XV "Druck" for 4 saxophones, 2 pianos and 2 percussionists [40'], U.A. Wittenner Tage für Neue Kammermusik 2013 (2011)
 Conference for the same titled film by Norbert Pfaffenbichler (2011)
 Monadologie XIVa "Puccini-Variationen: Butterfly-Overtüre" [9'], commissioned by Ostrava Center for New Music (2011)
 Monadologie XIVb "Puccini-Variationen: Im weiten Weltall fühlt sich der Yankee heimisch" [15'], commissioned by Nieuw Ensemble Amsterdam (2011)
 Monadologie XII for tp, sax, clar, akkordeon, piano, contrabass + 2 perc [40'] (2010–11)
 Monadologie XI "for Anton" (by Webern's II.Kammersinfonie), commissioned by MusikFabrik Köln [30'] (2010)
 DW22 "Winterlicht" for bass flute and contrabass,commissioned by Riccarda Caflisch [25'] (2010)
 TablesAreTurned for turntables and amplified ensemble by a song of Amon Düül2 [60'] (2010)
 DW21 "..and we just keep on pretending.." for flute and percussion [20'] (2010)
 Hermetica III for mixed choir [7'] (2010)
 Maschinenhalle#1 for 12 sounding disks, player pianos und 12 dancer [60']
 Standards-Project Preview: "My Funny V" for bass clarinet and tape, commissioned by WDR [8'] (2010)
 Monadologie X "alla turca" für player piano, commissioned by SWR [5'30"] (2010)
 Monadologie IX, III. Streichquartett, für Arditti String Quartet, commissioned by Donaueschingen, [60'] (2010)
 Monadologie VIII: Robotika II for Big Band, commissioned by HR [24'] (2009)
 Monadologie VII "Kammersinfonie" für Kammerorchester commissioned by Klangforum Wien [30'] (2009)
 Haydn bricht auf: Sieben Tage die die Welt verändern Puppentheater/Kabinettheater, Theater an der Wien (2008–09)
 Monadologie VI IN NOMINE for flute, clarinet, string trio and percussion, commissioned by ensemble recherche [5'] (2008)
 Monadologie V "Seven Last Words of Hasan" for piano solo [30'] (2008–09)
 Monadologie IV for 3 percussionists, U.A. Dresden 2009 [15'] (2008)
 Die Gläserne Kapelle interactive soundinstallation in the "Gläserne Manufaktur" for the "Saechsische Staatskapelle Dresden"'s 460th birthday
 Monadologie III "Lamentatio/Metamorphosis" for sring orchestra, commissioned by Sächsischen Staatskapelle Dresden and the Münchner Kammerorchesters [22'] (2008)
 Playhouse sound installation for 8-channels for an installation by Norbert Pfaffenbichler (2008)
 DW20 (Differenz/Wiederholung 20)"con complicatione": Hermetica I for boy's choir[5'] (2008)
 DW20 (Differenz/Wiederholung 20)"facile": Hermetica I for boy's choir [5'] (2008)
 Monadology II: A New Don Quichotte, commissioned by Sächsische Staatskapelle Dresden (2008)
 Montezuma Fallender Adler musical theater based on texts by Christian Loidl (2007-2009)
 DW4d for viola, trombone, piano and loopgenerator, commissioned by Ensemble Mosaik, Berlin (2007)
 Monadologie I for electric zither and large orchestra, commissioned by Musica Viva München, UA 2008 (2007)
 Paranoia for 2 rappers, tape and CD, commissioned by Donaueschingen (2007)
 Die Sterne des Hungers based on texts by Christine Lavant, U.A. Kunstfest Weimar 2007 (2007)
 Mosaik Mécanique music installation for Norbert Paffenbichler's film (2007)
 Der Alte vom Berge musical theater for 6 voices and amplified ensemble, UA Schwetzingen 2007 [ca 90'] (2007)
 DW6c for electric guitar and electric bass guitar, drums, and loop generator, commissioned by Wien Modern (2006)
 a1b2c3 music for a video by Pfaffenbichler and Schreiber
 Odio Mozart/I Hate Mozart musical theater in two acts, libretto by Michael Sturminger, Wiener Mozartjahr 2006 (2006)
 Schwarze Bänder.Hartmann-Studien sound installation for Musica Viva München 2005 (2005)
 The scythe remix of a music by Christoph Dientz [7'] (2004)
 esc#5 Impostors musical theater for 5 voices and amplified ensemble based on a text by Jonathan Safran Foer, U.A. Deutsche Oper Berlin 2005 [ca 20'] (2004)
 DW17 Doubles/Schatten II for electric viola, electric cello and surround orchestra [40'] U.A. Donaueschingen 2005 (2004)
 DW16 Songbook I for voice, saxophone, keyboards and percussion based on texts by Bob Dylan, Peter Hammill, Amon Düül2, Dieter Sperl und Robert Creeley [ca 35']U.A. Witten 2005 (2004)
 OP. 6.1 for electronics, U.A. Mittersill 2004 [13'] (2004)
 TRIKE summer dance performance Christine Gaigg Wien, ImPulsTanz (2004 )
 RETRO room installation for Wagner-Loops and one dancer(2004)
 I speak in riddles sound installation based on a text by Nora Gomringer, Bamberg, Villa Concordia Passage (2004)
 DW14 for saxophone, jazz trio and orchestra loops [40'] (2004)
 DW15 "Songs/Preludes" for zither and mezzo-soprano [26'] (2003)
 DW13b für sheng, viola, flute and loop-generator [21'] (2003)
 DW13 "the lotos pond" for 2 ensembles [22'] (2003)
 DW12 "cellular automata" for piano solo, U.A. Stuttgart 2005 [28'] (2003)
 DW11 "orchestra loops #2" for orchestra [26'] (2003)
 DW8 for orchestra and 2 turntablists [28'] (2003)
 DW9 "Puppe/Tulpe" for voice and 8 instruments based on texts by P. C. Loidl UA Wittenner Tage für Neue Kammermusik 2003 [26'] (2003)
 DW10b for koto, voice and loop-generator, U.A. Klangspuren Schwaz 2002 [16'] (2002)
 DW10a for koto, voice and loop-generator, U.A. Schwaz 2002 [16'] (2002)
 DW7 for large orchestra and loop-generator, U.A. Donaueschingen [22'] (2002)
 loops from the 4th district for contrabass and tape (2002)
 Differenz/Wiederholung 1.2 for flute, tenor saxand piano, U.A. Freiburg 2002 [23'] (2002)
 Roman Haubenstock-Ramati: Morendo adaption for electric bass flute and tape, U.A. New York 2002 [10'] (2002)
 DW6a for electric viola and electric violin and loop generator, U.A. New York 2002 [17'] (2002)
 Epilog für Stimme und Akkordeon nach Texten von Primo Levi
 Differenz/Wiederholung 6b "letter code#2" for electric guitar and loop-generator, U.A. Bremen 2001 [30'] (2001)
 Das Theater der Wiederholungen, musical theater, U.A. Graz 2003 [110'] (2000–02)
 Differenz/Wiederholung 5 for 14 instruments and tape [14'] (2000)
 Differenz/Wiederholung 4.1 "letter code#1" for trombone, electric viola and piano [20'] (2000)
 Differenz/Wiederholung 3 for flute, violoncello and akkordeon [24'] (2000)
 Differenz/Wiederholung 2 for amplified chamber ensemble and 3 voices, premiered Musikprotokoll Graz 1999 [49'] (1999)
 Differenz/Wiederholung 1 for flute, violoncello and piano [25'] (1998)
 Schrift 1.2 for flute solo(amanded version of "Schrift 1") [11'] (1998)
 Schrift/Fragment 4 for trumpet, horn and trombone, premiered Cagliari [2'] (1998)
 Schrift/Bild/Schrift for flute, oboe, clarinet, violin, viola, cello, piano, percussion and live amplification, U.A. Bludenz [23'] (1998)
 Schrift 3 for akkordeon solo [12'] (1997)
 60 FOR G. for saxophone quartet, U.A. Berlin 1997 [60"] (1997)
 Hommage à Martin Arnold 2 for large orchestra, premiered Grazer Musikverein 1997 [10'] (1996)
 Hommage à Martin Arnold 1 for tape, U.A. Allentsteig [10'] (1996)
 Schrift 2 for violoncello solo, U.A. Bludenz 1997 [14'] (1996)
 Schrift 1 for flute solo, UA Bratislava 1997 [10'] (1996)
 Versuch über das Vergessen 2 for violin, electric guitar and live-electronics, U.A. Musikprotokoll Graz 1995 [34'] (1995)
 Icht II for voice, tape and live-electronics, U.A. Offenes Kulturhaus Linz "Das Innere Ohr" 1995 [22'] (1995)
 Icht I for mezzo-soprano and eight instruments, U.A. Hannover 1997 [22'] (1994)
 Felder for string orchestra, U.A. Konzerthaus Wien 1994 [10'] (1994)
 Rondell-Remise for mobile chamber ensemble, mezzo-soprano and viola, U.A. Intro-Spektion Graz 1993 [20'] (1993)
 La Bas à S.  for low orchestra, two solistic tenor saxes and solo viola, U.A. Graz 1993 [10'] (1993)
 Küstenlinien for two pianos and double percussion, U.A. Thallin 1992 [16'] (1992)
 Brüche for clarinet, string quartet and prepared piano, U.A. Lange Nacht der Neuen Klänge, Konzerthaus Wien 1992 [21'] (1992)
 Quartett for flute solo, U.A. Alternativa Moskau 1991 [21'] (1991)
  2.Streichquartett "Kleine Welten", U.A. Musikprotokoll Graz 1991/Arditti Quartett [26'] (1991)
 Sonett 2 for mixed choir [5'] (1990)
 Sonett 1 for mixed choir [5'] (1990)
 Versuch über Drei Traumkongruenzen von Günther Freitag for actor, female singer, cello and live-electronics, U.A. Forum Stadtpark Graz 1990 [30'] (1990)
 Modern Monsters: 12 kleine Stücke für Violoncello und Klavier, U.A. Open Music, Graz 1991 [12'] (1990)
 Zwischen Morgen und Mitternacht for piano and string quartet, U.A. Die Andere Saite, Graz 1990 [17'] (1989)
 Radiophones Synchronizitätsexperiment 23 Montagen à 1', U.A. Kunstradio 1989 [23'] (1989)
 Niemandsland music for film [7'] (1989)
 Mozart 1789 for actress and nine tape recorders, premiere styriarte Graz 1989 [21'] (1989)
 Relief for flute, viola and harp, U.A. Die Andere Saite, Graz 1989 [14'] (1988)
 Stele for 2 quarter tone detuned pianos, U.A. Musikprotokoll Graz 1988 [12'] (1988)
 Hexagrammatikon for six computer controlled synthesizers, U.A. Allentsteig 1988 [60'] (1988)
 Romanze for piano, U.A. Klangzeichen 1992 [6'] (1988)
 Kohelet for choir, orchestra and soloists, U.A. Belgrad 1988 [28'] (1987)
 Deformazioni della Notte Concert for recorders, string orchestra and percussion, U.A. Komponistenportrait Graz 1987 [16'] (1986)
 Zeitmasken for string quartet, U.A. Die Andere Saite 1987 [24'] (1986)
 V for 64 analogue generators, U.A. Tage Absoluter Musik Allentsteig 1989 [9'] (1985)
 Necronomicon for clarinet, violin, violoncello and piano, U.A. Die Andere Saite, Graz 1986 [7'] (1985)
 Neue Tänze for violin and piano, U.A. Die Andere Saite, Graz 1987 [10'] (1985)

References

External links
 Official site
 
 The online music review La Folia offers an article on Lang's music
Publisher's Website: Ricordi

Austrian classical composers
Austrian opera composers
Male opera composers
Living people
1957 births
Austrian male classical composers
20th-century Austrian composers
20th-century Austrian male musicians